Coșteiu is a commune in Timiș County, Romania. It is composed of five villages: Coșteiu (commune seat), Hezeriș, Păru, Țipari and Valea Lungă Română. It is located on the right bank of the Timiș River, downstream from Lugoj.

History 

The first recorded mention of Coșteiu dates from 1597. The settlement was formed around a medieval castle known as Kastély, from which its name is derived (in Hungarian kastély means "castle"). On the Josephinische Landesaufnahme of 1717, it was listed under the name Gustik. Today's village was formed by merging three hamlets after 1945: Coșteiu Mare, Coșteiu Mic and Sâlha.

The Bega Canal played an important role in the history of Coșteiu. Work on the canal began in 1728. To regularize Bega, Dutch engineer  built a dam near Coșteiu between 1759 and 1760. It was rebuilt in 1860 after the catastrophic floods of the previous year.

Demographics 

Coșteiu had a population of 3,635 inhabitants at the 2011 census, down 5% from the 2002 census. Most inhabitants are Romanians (80.11%), larger minorities being represented by Hungarians (10.32%) and Roma (2.31%). For 6.74% of the population, ethnicity is unknown. By religion, most inhabitants are Orthodox (69.46%), but there are also minorities of Reformed (6.99%), Greek Catholics (5.91%), Pentecostals (3.71%), Roman Catholics (2.81%), Adventists (2.12%) and Baptists (1.21%). For 6.77% of the population, religious affiliation is unknown.

References 

Communes in Timiș County
Localities in Romanian Banat